Chernobyl is a novel by Frederik Pohl published in 1987. It is based on the 1986 Chernobyl disaster.

Plot summary
Chernobyl is a novel in which the characters must choose between accepting substandard materials or delaying an already overdue reactor schedule.

Reception
Dave Langford reviewed Chernobyl for White Dwarf #98, and stated that "Avoiding Evil Empire stereotypes, Pohl does his own country a service by reminding us that lots of Americans detest the knee-jerk, anti-commie paranoia which sometimes seems to be the US national stereotype. The technical background is all there too, in palatable form."

Reviews
Review by Dan Chow (1987) in Locus, #318 July 1987
Review by Don D'Ammassa (1987) in Science Fiction Chronicle, #96 September 1987
Review by Algis Budrys (1987) in The Magazine of Fantasy & Science Fiction, November 1987
Review by John Newsinger (1988) in Vector 142
Review by Andy Robertson (1988) in Interzone, #23 Spring 1988
Review by Andrew Andrews (1988) in Thrust, #31, Fall 1988

References

1987 novels
Books about the Chernobyl disaster
Novels by Frederik Pohl